The Boy Who Stopped Talking or  De Jongen Die niet meer Praatte  is a 1996 Dutch film directed by Ben Sombogaart.

Cast
Erçan Orhan, Mohammed Akkus (Memo)
Halsho Hussain, Mustafa
Brader Musiki, Hüsnü Akkus
Husna Killi, Fatma Akkus
Louis Ates, Jeroen Ligthart
Rick van Gastel, Thomas
Heleen Hummelen, Inge Smeets
Peter Bolhuis, Vader Jeroen
Barbara Feldbrugge, Moeder Jeroen
Jack Wouterse, Zwart
Coen van Vrijberghe de Coningh, Politieagent
Han Kerckhoffs, Chauffeur school bus
Bert Luppes, Politieagent
Shielan Muhammad, Rojda
Han Oldigs, Arts
Lava Sulayman, Zin Akkus
Cecil Toksöz, Kemal Mercan
Bas van de Berg, Dirk
Kay Depeweg, Lucas
Piotr Kukla, Scheidsrechter
Jaap Spijkers, Postbode
Wim Rijken, Politieagent
Peter Lusse, Politieagent
Ate de Jong, Politieagent
Herman Finkers, Politieagent
Frank Schaafsma, Politieagent

Synopsis 
Memo is a 9-year old Kurdish boy. He lives in Eastern Turkey together with his little sister and mother. He is very happy there. His father works in the Netherlands. In the area where Memo lives, war is on the horizon. His father decides to bring his family to the Netherlands. Memo doesn't want to, but nobody asked him anything. From then on, he decides not to talk anymore.

External links 
 

Dutch war drama films
1996 films
1990s Dutch-language films
Films directed by Ben Sombogaart